is a species of carpenter ant endemic to Japan.

Description
This major workers of this species have a head that is almost as wide as it is long, with subparallel sides and an almost straight posterior margin in full view.  Anterior margin clypeus slightly convex.  Mandible has five teeth and eyes are flat.  Antenae scrape extending past the posterior margin by about 1/5 of its length.

Distribution
This species of ant is endemic to Japan, and is particularly common around the Nansei Islands.

Ecology
Camponotus bishamon is an arboreal, or tree-dwelling, species of carpenter ant.

References

External links
 Camponotus bishamon from AntWeb

Insects described in 1999
bishamon
Endemic fauna of Japan
Ants of Japan